The Carpathian Concerto is a composition for a large symphony orchestra by Myroslav Skoryk. The work, written in 1972, "was inspired by the culture and folklore of the west region of Ukraine."

References

Sources 
 Кияновська Любов. Мирослав Скорик: творчий портрет композитора в дзеркалі епохи. Львів: Сполом, 1998, .
 Кияновська Любов. Мирослав Скорик: людина і митець. Львів, 2008, .
 Щириця Юрій. Мирослав Скорик. Київ: Музична Україна, 1979.

Concertos for orchestra
Compositions by Myroslav Skoryk